The 1989 Men's Singapore Airlines & Ascot Sport World Team Squash Championships were held in Singapore and took place from October 9 until October 16, 1989.

Seeds

Results

Pool A

Pool B

Quarter-finals

Semi-finals

Third Place Play Off

Final

References

See also 
World Team Squash Championships
World Squash Federation
World Open (squash)

World Squash Championships
Squash tournaments in Singapore
International sports competitions hosted by Singapore
Squash
Men